András Takács (3 July 1945 – 12 May 2015) was a Hungarian cyclist. He competed at the 1968, 1972 and 1980 Summer Olympics.

References

External links
 

1945 births
2015 deaths
Hungarian male cyclists
Hungarian male speed skaters
Olympic cyclists of Hungary
Cyclists at the 1968 Summer Olympics
Cyclists at the 1972 Summer Olympics
Cyclists at the 1980 Summer Olympics
Cyclists from Budapest